IPSC Chile is the Chilean association for practical shooting under the International Practical Shooting Confederation.

External links 
 Official homepage of IPSC Chile

References 

Regions of the International Practical Shooting Confederation
Sports organisations of Chile